The 2nd Indiana Cavalry Regiment, later designated the 41st Indiana Infantry Regiment, was the first complete cavalry regiment raised in the U.S. state of Indiana to fight in the American Civil War.

Service
 Organized at Indianapolis, Indiana, on September 20, 1861, with John A. Bridgeland as colonel, the regiment moved to Kentucky in December as part of the Union Army of the Ohio
 First action in a skirmish at Bowling Green
 Occupation of Nashville, Tennessee
 Battle of Shiloh
 Siege of Corinth
 Battle of Perryville
 Battle of Stones River
 Battle of Chickamauga
 Defense of the Nashville and Chattanooga Railroad
 Skirmish with a Confederate force on October 2, 1863, in defense of Union communications, brought the 2nd Indiana fame when a sketch of the action appeared in Harper's Weekly for October 31
 The regiment saw further action through the end of the war
 Mustered out of service in Tennessee in July 1865

According to Frederick H. Dyer (see references) the 2nd Indiana's total service fatalities were four officers and 38 enlistees killed and mortally wounded, and three officers and 211 enlistees dead of disease.

See also

 List of Indiana Civil War regiments
 Indiana in the Civil War

References

External links
 Indiana in the Civil War: Dyer's summary of the 2nd Indiana's service
 Son of the South: Image of sketch by artist Theodore Davis of 2nd Indiana and 1st Wisconsin in action against Confederate forces

2 cav
Military units and formations established in 1861
1861 establishments in Indiana
Military units and formations disestablished in 1865